Oliver–Morton Farm is a historic tobacco farm complex and national historic district located near Oak Hill, Granville County, North Carolina.  The Samuel V. Morton farmhouse was built about 1890, and is a two-story, three bay, Italianate style I-house dwelling.  It has a one-story rear ell.  The Oliver House dates to about 1800, and is a 1 1/2-story brick-nogged heavy timber frame building.  It is one of Granville County's oldest buildings, and was converted to a packhouse in the early 20th century.  Also on the property are the contributing potato house, two sheds, striphouse, and corn crib.

It was listed on the National Register of Historic Places in 1988.

References

Tobacco buildings in the United States
Farms on the National Register of Historic Places in North Carolina
Historic districts on the National Register of Historic Places in North Carolina
Georgian architecture in North Carolina
Italianate architecture in North Carolina
Houses completed in 1800
Houses in Granville County, North Carolina
National Register of Historic Places in Granville County, North Carolina